"You Can't Get Away from the Blarney" is a song from 1917 by composer Albert Von Tilzer and lyricist Darl Mac Boyle. It was published by Broadway Music Corporation.

The sheet music can be found at the Pritzker Military Museum & Library.

References

Bibliography

1917 songs
Songs about Ireland
Songs of World War I
Songs written by Albert Von Tilzer